Magnet Cove School District is a school district headquartered in Magnet Cove, Arkansas (with a Malvern postal address), with portions in Hot Spring County and Garland County.

Within Hot Springs County it includes Magnet Cove and Jones Mills, along with a small portion of Rockport.

It operates three schools: an elementary school, a middle school and a high school.

History
In 1979 the Rural Dale School District dissolved, with a portion going to the Magnet Cove district.

Schools
 Magnet Cove High School
 Magnet Cove Middle School
 Magnet Cove Elementary School

References

Further reading
These include maps of predecessor districts:
 (Download)

External links
 

Education in Garland County, Arkansas
Education in Hot Spring County, Arkansas
School districts in Arkansas